The 1975–76 season was Cardiff City F.C.'s 49th season in the Football League. They competed in the 24-team Division Three, then the third tier of English football, finishing second, winning promotion to Division Two on the first attempt after being relegated the previous year.

Manager Jimmy Andrews brought a number of changes to the squad including bringing Brian Clark
back to the club and signing Australian international Adrian Alston.

Players

First team squad.

League standings

Results by round

Fixtures & Results

Third Division

Source

League Cup 

Source

FA Cup 

Source

Welsh Cup

Note - the original first leg of the final, played at Ninian Park on 29 April, was declared to be null and void by the Welsh FA, because the scorer of both Hereford's goals in the 2–2 draw was deemed to be ineligible.

See also
Cardiff City F.C. seasons

References

Bibliography

Welsh Football Data Archive

Cardiff City F.C. seasons
Association football clubs 1975–76 season
Card